The 1982 UCLA Bruins softball team represented the University of California, Los Angeles in the 1982 college softball season.  The Bruins were coached by Sharron Backus, who led her eighth season.  The Bruins played their home games at Sunset Field and finished with a record of 33–7–2.  They competed in the Western Collegiate Athletic Association, where they finished second with a 15–4–1 record.

The Bruins were invited to the 1982 NCAA Division I softball tournament, where they swept the Central Regional and then completed an undefeated run through the Women's College World Series to claim the first NCAA Women's College World Series Championship.  The Bruins had earlier claimed an AIAW title in 1978.

Personnel

Roster

Coaches

Schedule

References

UCLA
UCLA Bruins softball seasons
1982 in sports in California
Women's College World Series seasons
NCAA Division I softball tournament seasons